This is a list of members of the Council of the German Cultural Community between 1974 and 1977, following the (first) direct elections of 1974.

Composition

Sources
 

List
1970s in Belgium